Péter Gulácsi (born 6 May 1990) is a Hungarian footballer who plays as a goalkeeper for Bundesliga club RB Leipzig and the Hungary national team.

Club career

Liverpool

Liverpool signed Gulácsi from MTK Budapest on a one-year loan in 2007, with the player competing in the treble winning reserve team. Liverpool had an option to buy him at the end of this loan deal, which they exercised on the last day of the transfer window, 1 September 2008. Gulácsi was the third person to sign for Liverpool from MTK, with previous signings András Simon and Krisztián Németh.

On 29 July and 5 August 2010, he was the substitute goalkeeper in both of Liverpool's UEFA Europa League ties against Rabotnički, with Liverpool winning 2–0 on both occasions. He also found himself on the bench on 26 August in Liverpool's Europa League tie against Trabzonspor. He was a frequent presence on the subs bench in January 2011, with Brad Jones away at the AFC Asian Cup. With Jones still away at the Asian Cup, Gulácsi was the substitute keeper for their 1–0 Premier League win over Chelsea at Stamford Bridge. Gulácsi retained his spot as back-up to Pepe Reina after Brad Jones returned from international duty, with the Aussie 'keeper going to Derby County on a loan transfer in March 2011.

In the 2009 January transfer window, he was loaned to Hereford United, where he made his league debut. He went on to make 18 league appearances for the club.

On 16 April 2010, Gulácsi joined Tranmere Rovers on an emergency seven-day loan deal and made his debut for the club on 17 April against Exeter City in a 3–1 win for Tranmere. His loan was subsequently extended for an additional seven days and into a third week.

He re-joined Rovers on a one-month emergency loan on 17 September 2010 after Tranmere's two experienced goalkeepers Gunnar Nielsen and Simon Miotto were ruled out with injuries His loan period was extended into a second month until 24 November 2010.

Hull City (loan)

On 19 July 2011, he signed a new contract with Liverpool and joined Championship team Hull City in a year-long loan move. He made his full debut for Hull in a start of the season clash against recently relegated Blackpool at the KC Stadium.

He received a knee injury in a 1–0 defeat at Burnley on 31 December 2011 and was substituted for Adriano Basso on the 42nd minute mark, shortly after conceding a goal, scored by Martin Paterson, as a result of a defensive mix-up with Jack Hobbs.  Following the injury, Gulácsi returned to Liverpool for a scan on his knee.

On 11 April 2012, Liverpool contacted Hull with a view to recalling Gulácsi from his loan subject to Premier League, Football League and FA approval. Liverpool were at that time suffering a goalkeeper crisis, with both Pepe Reina and Doni serving suspensions, leaving Brad Jones as their only remaining senior goalkeeper. He finished his time with Hull City with 15 appearances.

Return to Liverpool
The loan recall was approved and Gulácsi took his place on the bench for the FA Cup semi-final, which Liverpool won 2–1. He featured in all three of Liverpool's pre-season games in North America.

Red Bull Salzburg
On 7 June 2013, Red Bull Salzburg announced they had signed Gulácsi on a free transfer from Liverpool on a four-year deal. He played his first match in Salzburg's colours in the ÖFB-Cup, against Union St. Florian from the third division, at an eventual 9–0 away win.

On 20 July 2013, he made his debut in the Austrian Bundesliga against Wiener Neustadt at an eventual 5–1 away win.

RB Leipzig

On 1 July 2015, Gulácsi transferred to RB Leipzig, the sister club of Red Bull Salzburg, for a fee of 3 million pounds. He finished the 2015–16 season by making 15 appearances for the first team and two appearances in the Regionalliga Nordost for the reserve team.

On 17 December 2017, Gulácsi signed a new contract with RB Leipzig. His contract with the club would have expired in 2020 but he prolonged it by 2022. He finished the 2016–17 season with 34 appearances.

Gulácsi was selected as the best goalkeeper of the autumn part of the 2017–18 Bundesliga season by the German sport magazine Kicker. He finished the 2017–18 season with 47 appearances. According to leading German sports magazine kicker, Gulácsi performed best in the Bundesliga's 2018–19 season matchday ratings with an average score of 2.61 and 16 clean sheets.

In the 2019–20 season, Gulácsi made history by qualifying for the UEFA Champions League semi-finals, the first time ever for RB Leipzig.

Following the departure of Marcel Sabitzer, Gulácsi was appointed as the new club captain. On 7 May 2021, Gulácsi signed a contract extension with Leipzig, keeping him at the club until 2025.

On 23 May 2022, Gulácsi helped Leipzig claim their first piece of major silverware in club history in winning the DFB-Pokal. In the final against Freiburg, Gulácsi forced two misses in the penalty shoot-out.

On 5 October 2022, he tore the anterior cruciate ligament in his right knee, in a 3–1 win against Celtic in the Champions League.

International career
In May 2008, Gulácsi received his first call up for Hungary and was an unused substitute in their 1–1 draw with Croatia.

Gulácsi was Hungary's hero against the Czech Republic in the FIFA U-20 World Cup in the penalty shootouts. In the third place match between Hungary and Costa Rica at 2009 FIFA U-20 World Cup, he saved three penalties during penalty shoot-out leading his team to victory and bronze medals.

On 4 June 2012, he was invited by Sándor Egervári to the Hungary squad for a friendly match against the Republic of Ireland, but did not play.

Gulácsi made his debut for the senior team on 22 May 2014 in a 2–2 draw against Denmark.

He was selected for Hungary's Euro 2016 squad.

On 1 June 2021, Gulácsi was included in the final 26-man squad to represent Hungary at the rescheduled UEFA Euro 2020 tournament.

Outside football
In 2021, a post on Gulácsi's Facebook page caused a turmoil in Hungarian media. He expressed his wish to join the Family Is Family campaign in Hungary, a campaign that promotes acceptance of same-sex marriage and LGBT rights in Hungary. Former Hungary international player János Hrutka stood by Gulácsi. Subsequently, Hrutka was fired from the TV channel Spíler TV he was working for as a commentator.

Career statistics

Club

International

Honours
Red Bull Salzburg
Austrian Bundesliga: 2013–14, 2014–15
Austrian Cup: 2013–14, 2014–15

RB Leipzig
DFB-Pokal: 2021–22

Hungary U20
FIFA U-20 World Cup third place: 2009

Individual
kicker Bundesliga Team of the Season: 2018–19
Hungarian Footballer of the Year (Golden Ball): 2018, 2019

References

External links

 Péter Gulácsi profile at magyarfutball.hu
 Profile at the RB Leipzig website
 
 LFC History profile
 

1990 births
Living people
Footballers from Budapest
Hungarian footballers
Hungary youth international footballers
Hungary under-21 international footballers
Hungary international footballers
Association football goalkeepers
MTK Budapest FC players
Liverpool F.C. players
Hereford United F.C. players
Tranmere Rovers F.C. players
Hull City A.F.C. players
FC Red Bull Salzburg players
RB Leipzig II players
RB Leipzig players
English Football League players
Austrian Football Bundesliga players
Regionalliga players
2. Bundesliga players
Bundesliga players
UEFA Euro 2016 players
UEFA Euro 2020 players
Hungarian expatriate footballers
Expatriate footballers in England
Expatriate footballers in Austria
Expatriate footballers in Germany
Hungarian expatriate sportspeople in England
Hungarian expatriate sportspeople in Austria
Hungarian expatriate sportspeople in Germany